Viddal Ethan Danso Riley (born 7 July 1997) is a British professional boxer, YouTuber, internet personality and rapper. He is notable as being the former boxing trainer and associate of YouTube personality KSI.

Viddal Riley is cousins with grime artist Wretch 32.

Riley represented England at the EUBC European Junior Boxing Championships in Anapa, Russia in 2013, winning a silver medal. He is undefeated in his professional career of 8 bouts. Riley was promoted under Mayweather Promotions.

Early life
Viddal Riley was born on 7 July 1997 in Hackney, London. He attended Northumberland Park Community School in the Northumberland Park area of Tottenham in the London Borough of Haringey, England.

While he was still an amateur boxer, Riley had a day job as a personal trainer at a GymBox gym in Stratford, London. It was here that he first met and trained several YouTube personalities, including KSI. The two fights between KSI and Logan Paul brought Riley huge publicity and exposure.

Riley is a supporter of his local football club Tottenham Hotspur F.C.

Amateur career 
Riley started his boxing career at six years old when he was introduced to the sport by his father Derrick Riley. As a young amateur, he trained at West Ham Boxing Club. He went on to collect eight national championships, as well as winning a European Junior Silver Medal in Anapa, Russia. He also became a 2014 Nanjing Youth Olympian for Team GB. Riley amassed an amateur record of 41–8 (19 KO's).

Professional career 
Riley first entered the Mayweather Boxing Club in Las Vegas in 2018 in preparation for KSI's second amateur fight with Logan Paul. There, he sparred the American NABF cruiserweight champion at the time, Andrew Tabiti. In doing so, he impressed Jeff Mayweather and Amer Abdallah, with whom he subsequently signed a deal to turn professional.

Riley made his professional debut on 30 November 2018 at the Big Punch Arena in Tijuana, Mexico against Julio Manuel Gonzalez, beating Gonzalez by knockout in the first round. He recorded another first-round knockout in his next fight, against Mitchell Spangler at the MGM Grand Garden Arena in Las Vegas on 19 January 2019, on the undercard of the WBA welterweight championship bout between Manny Pacquiao and Adrien Broner. Riley's third fight was a unanimous decision victory against Austine Nnamdi in Dubai on 3 May 2019, in which he headlined as the main event.

In November 2019, fellow countryman Lawrence Okolie, who would later become WBO world cruiserweight champion, praised Riley, stating that Riley "is in the top 5 [people] I've sparred".

Riley would next face Muhammad Abdullah in Las Vegas on 28 February 2020, achieving another unanimous decision victory to improve to 4–0.

He had been scheduled to fight on the undercard of the WBA lightweight title fight between Gervonta Davis and Yuriorkis Gamboa in 2019, in addition to fighting Rashad Coulter on the undercard of Mike Tyson vs. Roy Jones Jr. in 2020, but he was forced to pull out of both fights due to a recurring back injury.

In November 2021, Riley signed a multi-fight deal with the promotional company Boxxer.

It was announced that Riley would make a debut in the United Kingdom as an undercard match of Amir Khan vs. Kell Brook on 19 February 2022. On 11 February 2022 on Twitter, Riley had announced his opponent as Namibian boxer Willbeforce Shihepo. Riley won the fight by unanimous decision to put his record at 5–0.

During his sixth professional bout on the undercard of Richard Riakporhe vs. Fabio Turchi on 11 June 2022, Riley produced a huge knockout victory over Jone Volau, fifty-one seconds into the first round.

Professional boxing record

Other ventures 
Riley maintains a strong social media presence: he has a YouTube channel with over one million subscribers as of April 2021, and releases original music independently on online streaming services Spotify and Apple Music.

He is the founder and owner of RIL Athletics, his own clothing brand.

Discography

Mixtapes

Extended plays

As Lead Artist

As Featured Artist

Guest Appearances

Music Videos

Filmography

References

British male boxers
People from Hackney Central
Cruiserweight boxers
1997 births
Living people
Black British sportspeople
Boxers from Greater London
Boxing trainers
British boxing trainers